Decha Phetakua (born January 30, 1983) is a retired professional footballer from Thailand. before moving to PTT Rayong.

References

External links
Profile

1983 births
Living people
Decha Phetakua
Decha Phetakua
Association football defenders
Decha Phetakua
Decha Phetakua
Decha Phetakua
Decha Phetakua
Decha Phetakua
Decha Phetakua